Miroslav Trunda (born 3 November 1984) is a Czech equestrian. He competed in the individual eventing at the 2020 Summer Olympics.

References

External links
 

1984 births
Living people
Czech male equestrians
Olympic equestrians of the Czech Republic
Equestrians at the 2020 Summer Olympics
Place of birth missing (living people)
Event riders